These are the Canadian number-one albums of 1996. The chart was compiled and published by RPM every Monday. From November 11, the chart began to be compiled by Nielsen SoundScan with the retail sales from Monday to Sunday and published every Monday by RPM. The chart appears also in Billboard magazine as Top Canadian Albums.

References

See also
List of Canadian number-one singles of 1996

1996
1996 record charts
1996 in Canadian music